Joshua William Grant (born 11 October 1998) is an English professional footballer who plays as a defender and defensive midfielder for Bristol Rovers.

Club career

Chelsea
Born in Brixton, London, Grant joined Chelsea at under-8 level. In January 2019, Grant joined EFL League Two club Yeovil Town on loan until the end of the 2018–19 season. He made his English Football League debut the day after joining Yeovil in a 1–0 win against Mansfield Town, on 12 January 2019. On 8 August 2019, Grant joined EFL League Two club Plymouth Argyle on loan until the end of 2019.

On 26 June 2020, it was announced that Grant would leave Chelsea upon the expiry of his contract at the end of the month.

Bristol Rovers
On 18 July 2020, Grant signed for League One club Bristol Rovers, signing a three-year deal. He made his debut for the club on 5 September 2020, in a 3-0 League Cup defeat to Ipswich Town. On 14 November, Grant scored his first goal for the club, halving the deficit to 2–1 in an eventual 4–1 defeat to Fleetwood Town.

Grant featured in all of Rovers' first ten matches in all competitions for the 2021–22 season before a recurring foot injury that he had suffered with the previous season forced him out of action. His return to action came on 7 November in a 2–2 FA Cup First Round draw at League One Oxford United, Grant being utilised in a less-familiar left wing-back role in which he impressed. His first league match back came the following week, Grant scoring his first goal of the season when he headed home a Harry Anderson cross at the back post to equalise as the Gas came from behind to defeat Northampton Town. Despite an impressive run of form over the winter months, Grant again suffered from injuries, this time in the knee, that saw him ruled out for a number of weeks in February. Grant made a return to first-team action in April 2022, the season ending in success as Rovers were promoted on the final day of the season, a 7–0 victory over Scunthorpe United seeing Rovers move into third place on goals scored.

Having been limited to just ten minutes of action in the opening weeks of the 2022–23 season, manager Barton revealed in October 2022 that knee surgery would potentially be required. Having undergone the surgery the same month, Grant was ruled out of action for the remainder of the season.

International career
Grant made his debut for England under-18s in June 2016, before featuring for the victorious England under-20 side at the 2017 Toulon Tournament.

Career statistics

Honours
Bristol Rovers
League Two promotion: 2021–22

References

1998 births
Living people
Footballers from Brixton
England youth international footballers
English footballers
Association football defenders
Chelsea F.C. players
Yeovil Town F.C. players
Plymouth Argyle F.C. players
Bristol Rovers F.C. players
English Football League players
Black British sportsmen